The University of Computer Studies, Mandalay (UCSM), located in Mandalay, is a  Myanmar IT and computer science university. UCSM offers bachelor's, master's and doctoral degree programs in computer science and technology. The majority of its student body is from Upper Myanmar. Administered by the Ministry of Education, UCSM is the official university for all the Government Computer Colleges in Upper Myanmar, whose students may continue their advanced studies at UCSM.

UCSM is also a Cisco networking academy.

History
UCSM was established in May 1997 and held its first classes in September 1997. Under Myanmar's system of specialized universities, UCSM was the first specialized university in Upper Myanmar for computer science and technology.

Degree programmes
UCSM's main offerings are five-year bachelor's programs in computer science and computer technology. It also offers master's degree programs in applied science and in information science. The areas of study include artificial intelligence, bioinformatics, computer architecture, control applications, database systems, digital signal processing, image processing, Internet technologies, network security, operating systems, parallel and distributed computing, and software engineering.

Academic departments
UCSM consists of four faculties and three academic departments.
 Faculty of Computer Science
 Faculty of Computer Systems and Technologies
 Faculty of Information Science
 Faculty of Computing
 Department of Information Technology Support and Maintenance
 Department of Languages
 Department of Natural Science

Affiliations

Senior universities
 Keio University of Japan
 University of Computer Studies, Yangon (UCSY)

Colleges
The following Upper Myanmar-based Government Computer Colleges are officially affiliated with UCSM. Their qualified graduates can continue their advanced studies at UCSM.
 Computer University, Myitkyina
 Computer University, Bhamo
 Computer University, Kalay
 Computer University, Monywa
 Computer University, Mandalay
 Computer University, Pakokku
 Computer University, Lashio
 Computer University, Kengtung
 Computer University, Taunggyi
 Computer University, Panglong
 Computer University, Meiktila
 Computer University, Magway

References

Universities and colleges in Mandalay
Technological universities in Myanmar
Educational institutions established in 1997
1997 establishments in Myanmar